Nyaksimvol is a rural locality (a selo) in Beryozovsky District of Khanty-Mansi Autonomous Okrug, Russia, located on the left bank of the Severnaya Sosva River,  southwest of Khulimsunt.

Etymology
Its name probably derives from the Mansi words nyakhsyam ("gills") or nyaksi ("dirt") combined with vol ("reach"), and hence means either "Gill reach" or "Dirty Flatwater."

Climate
Nyaksimvol has a subarctic climate (Köppen climate classification Dfc). Precipitation is moderate and is somewhat higher in summer than at other times of the year.

Notable people
Sergey Sobyanin, Russian politician who was born here

References

Rural localities in Khanty-Mansi Autonomous Okrug